General in Chief has been a military rank or title in various armed forces around the world.

France 
In France, general-in-chief was first an informal title for the lieutenant-general commanding over others lieutenant-generals, or even for some marshals in charge of an army. During the Revolution, it became a title given to officers of général de division rank commanding an army. The généraux en chef wore four stars on their shoulders boards opposed to the three of a général de division. The title of général en chef was abolished in 1812, re-established during the Restoration and ultimately abolished in 1848.

Russia 

In Russia, general-in-chief (probably originating from the French général en chef), was a full general rank in the Russian Imperial army, the second highest rank, after the rank of marshal, in Russian military ranks (the 2nd grade of Table of Ranks). It was created in 1698 by Peter the Great.  In 1798, the rank was divided into three equivalent ranks of general of the infantry, general of the cavalry and general of the artillery.

United States 
In the United States, the title "General in Chief" was used to refer to the commanding general of the United States Army, who was the Army's senior-most officer. Famous generals-in-chief were George Washington, Winfield Scott, Henry Halleck, George McClellan, and Ulysses S. Grant (Washington's title was commander-in-chief during the American Revolution, and he was only called the "Senior Officer of the Army" after he was president in the late 1790s). The position of "general-in-chief," not the commanding general of the United States Army, was abolished with the creation of the title of chief of staff in 1903 — the Chief of Staff of the United States Army is the modern-day equivalent, although the current position is not responsible for commanding military forces in the field, as the generals-in-chief did in the 19th century.  The rank of "General of the Armies of the United States" was conferred upon General John J. Pershing in 1919 and to Lieutenant General George Washington (posthumously) in 1975 by acts of Congress.  Washington's date of rank was retroactively dated to 1799, so that he will always be the senior ranking general of the United States Army.

Confederate States 
On January 31, 1865, the 2nd Confederate States Congress established a “General in Chief of the Armies of the Confederate States”. General Robert E. Lee was appointed to the position on February 6 and served until the end of the American Civil War. During the entire time, Lee retained command of the Army of Northern Virginia, serving in both positions until he was paroled as a prisoner of war on April 12.

Venezuela 

Since the age of the independence war in Venezuela, the most senior officer is designated as general-in-chief (general en jefe). From its creation, the rank was represented by three suns (equivalent to three-star rank), but with the creation in 2008 of the rank of major general, four suns (equivalent to four-star rank) are used.

From the 1940s until 2001 the rank was not used. In 2001 Divisional General Lucas Rincon Romero was promoted to general-in-chief. He was the first-ever active officer to be promoted after six decades.

Since 2001, 18 officers have been promoted to this rank or equivalent (13 from the Army including 3 posthumously, 1 from the Air Force, also posthumously, 2 from the Navy, 1 other naval recipient having been promoted to Admiral plus 1 posthumously):

See also
 General officer

References

Military chiefs of staff
Military ranks